Senator Lovejoy may refer to:

Allen P. Lovejoy (1825–1904), Wisconsin State Senate
George A. Lovejoy (New Hampshire politician) (1931–2015), New Hampshire State Senate
George A. Lovejoy (Washington politician) (1879–1944), Washington State Senate
Lynda Lovejoy (born 1949), New Mexico State Senate